Dinoplax gigas, the giant chiton, is a species of chiton in the family Chaetopleuridae. It is a marine mollusc.

Description
These large chitons are elongate, oval, carinate and moderately elevated. They have strongly arched grey or brown valves. The leathery girdle is greyish or brown, spotted with black and has tufts of short hairs.

Ecology
This species hides under rocks during the day but emerges at night.

Distribution
This species is found around the South African coast from the Cape Peninsula to Durban, subtidally to at least 5 m.

References

External links

Chaetopleuridae
Chitons described in 1791
Taxa named by Johann Friedrich Gmelin